Daecheon-dong is a dong (neighborhood) in Boryeong, South Chungcheong Province, South Korea.

External links 
  The office of Daecheon 1-dong, Boryeong
  The office of Daecheon 2-dong, Boryeong
  The office of Daecheon 3-dong, Boryeong
  The office of Daecheon 4-dong, Boryeong
  The office of Daecheon 5-dong, Boryeong

Boryeong
Neighbourhoods in South Korea